The ARIA Dance Singles Chart ranks the best performing  dance music tracks within Australia and is provided by the Australian Recording Industry Association.

History
The Dance Singles Chart was established in 2001 and first published on 1 January. The chart still runs weekly . The current number one is "10:35" by Tiësto and Tate McRae.

Trivia

Songs with the most weeks at number one
82 weeks
Glass Animals – "Heat Waves" (2021–2022)
26 weeks
David Guetta and Bebe Rexha – "I'm Good (Blue)" (2022–2023)
25 weeks
Saint Jhn and Imanbek – "Roses (Imanbek remix)" (2020)
23 weeks
Joel Corry and MNEK – "Head & Heart" (2020–2021)
20 weeks
Regard – "Ride It" (2019–2020)
19 weeks
Las Ketchup – "The Ketchup Song (Aserejé)" (2002–2003)
17 weeks
Marshmello featuring Khalid – "Silence" (2017–2018)
16 weeks 
Major Lazer and DJ Snake featuring MØ – "Lean On" (2015)
15 weeks
LMFAO – "Sexy And I Know It" (2011–2012)
The Chainsmokers featuring Halsey – "Closer" (2016)
14 weeks
Kesha – "Tik Tok" (2009–2010)
13 weeks
Public Domain – "Operation Blade (Bass in the Place)" (2001)
Lady Gaga – "Poker Face" (2008–2009)
Enrique Iglesias featuring Pitbull – "I Like It" (2010)
Timmy Trumpet and Savage – "Freaks" (2014)
12 weeks 
Madonna featuring "Britney Spears" – "Me Against the Music" (2003–2004)
Gwen Stefani – "What You Waiting For?" (2004–2005)
Crazy Frog – "Axel F" (2005)
TV Rock featuring Seany B – "Flaunt It" (2006)
Gnarls Barkley – "Crazy" (2006)
Scissor Sisters – "I Don't Feel Like Dancin'" (2006–2007)
David Guetta featuring Akon – "Sexy Bitch" (2009)
Calvin Harris featuring Rihanna – "This Is What You Came For" (2016)
Calvin Harris featuring Pharrell Williams, Katy Perry and Big Sean – "Feels" (2017)

Artists with the most number ones
This list includes main artists and featured artists.

David Guetta (11)
Calvin Harris (9)
Britney Spears (6)
Kylie Minogue (6)
Lady Gaga (6)
Clean Bandit (4)
Flume (4)
Kesha (4)
Madonna (4)
The Chainsmokers (3)
Jonas Blue (3)
Ricki-Lee (3)
Sia (3)
Justin Timberlake (3)

Cumulative weeks at number one
Glass Animals (82)
David Guetta (65)
Calvin Harris (51)
Britney Spears (44)
Lady Gaga (39)
Bebe Rexha (26)
Saint Jhn (25)
Imanbek (25)
Joel Corry (23)
MNEK (23)
Regard (20)
Kylie Minogue (17)

See also
ARIA Charts

References

Australian record charts